Marcelo Salinas Paulino (born 29 May 1995), known also as Marcelo Paulino, is a Chilean-Portuguese football goalkeeper.

Club career
As a youth player, Salinas was with Hannover 96, TUS Wettbergen, Wolfsburg and Borussia Dortmund in Germany and Colo-Colo in Chile. 

In January 2016, he joined Unión Española in the Chilean Primera División and made his professional debut in a match versus O'Higgins by replacing .

International career
Previously to 2013 FIFA U-20 World Cup, he took part of Chile, making appearances in the 2012 Milk Cup. Before he had made appearances for both Portugal and Germany at youth level.

Personal life
His father is Chilean and his mother is Portuguese.

References

External links
 
 
 Marcelo Salinas at PlaymakerStats

1995 births
Living people
German footballers
Association football goalkeepers
Sportspeople of Chilean descent
German people of Chilean descent
German people of Portuguese descent
Germany youth international footballers
Naturalised citizens of Portugal
Portuguese people of Chilean descent
Portuguese footballers
Portugal youth international footballers
Citizens of Chile through descent
Chilean people of Portuguese descent
Chilean footballers
Chile under-20 international footballers
Unión Española footballers
Chilean Primera División players
Naturalized citizens of Chile